Carideicomes is a Gram-negative, strictly aerobic, oval-shaped and non-motile bacterial genus from the family Rhodobacteraceae with one known species (''Carideicomes alvinocaridis).

References

Rhodobacteraceae
Bacteria genera
Taxa described in 2020
Monotypic bacteria genera